Sarangesa maculata is a species of butterfly in the family Hesperiidae. It is found in Cameroon, the Democratic Republic of the Congo, Uganda, Kenya, Tanzania, Zambia, Malawi, Mozambique and Zimbabwe. The habitat consists of wooded savanna.

The larvae feed on Asystasia gangetica.

References

Butterflies described in 1891
Celaenorrhinini
Butterflies of Africa